Mrs. Pym of Scotland Yard is a 1939 British comedy-drama film based on the Mrs Pym novels by Nigel Morland.  Written by Morland, the film was produced in London at Highbury Studios and was directed by Fred Elles.  The film provided actress Mary Clare with her only title role. It was also the debut film role for Nigel Patrick.  Filming took place in July 1939 with the film released in January 1940.

The film concerns the investigation of the murders of two people who are members of the same psychic club by Scotland Yard's only female detective Mrs Pym.  As well as solving the murders Mrs Pym also has to deal with unhelpful male colleagues and her good-natured but dumb assistant Inspector Shott.

Morland re-used the title for one of his books in 1946.

Cast
 Mary Clare as Mrs Pym
 Edward Lexy as Inspector Shott
 Anthony Ireland as Henry Mencken, a medium 
 Irene Handl as Mrs Bell, Mencken's assistant
 Nigel Patrick as Richard Loddon, a reporter

Reception
Monthly Film Bulletin considered the story as ingenious and described Clare as "outstandingly good as the heroine" with a competent supporting cast.

References

External links

1939 films
British black-and-white films
1939 comedy-drama films
British comedy-drama films
Films set in London
Films shot at Highbury Studios
1930s British films